Gudugudu is a traditional drum used by the Yoruba ethnic group of Nigeria.  The gudugudu is a time keeping drum for the dundun family of drums that are said to mimic speech. It is designed to produce a sharp and loud beat that all the other drummers can hear and keep in time with. The gudugudu player, in turn, takes his cues from the master drummer who plays a large talking drum, or dun-dun. It can be seen and experienced in modern sekere, fuji, apala and possibly juju cultural performances.

Design
The gudugudu drum is shaped like a bowl.  It is round, small, and has a single animal skin drum head.  The gudugudu is played with two thin and semi-flexible dried rolled sticks or "lashes" made of cow skin (in its dried form commonly called "rawhide").

See also
Music of Nigeria

References

External links
Gudugudu drum in a musical excerpt from the album "West Africa: Drum Chant & Instrumental Music"
Picture of a gudugudu drum

Yoruba musical instruments
African drums
Nigerian musical instruments